Daniela Kadeva (born 1 January 1994) is a Bulgarian biathlete. She represented Bulgaria at the Biathlon World Championships 2015 in Kontiolahti.

References

1994 births
Living people
Bulgarian female biathletes
Olympic biathletes of Bulgaria
Biathletes at the 2018 Winter Olympics
Biathletes at the 2022 Winter Olympics
Place of birth missing (living people)
Biathletes at the 2012 Winter Youth Olympics
People from Bansko
Sportspeople from Blagoevgrad Province
21st-century Bulgarian women